The Jam Factory is a shopping and entertainment centre, located in Chapel Street, South Yarra, a suburb of Melbourne, Australia. The Jam Factory is owned by Newmark Capital. It is also the headquarters of Village Roadshow.

History
The Jam Factory was originally established as the Victorian Brewery in 1858, having a value of 150 pounds. The brewery shut down in 1876, with the building and land then being purchased the same year by Robert Wright and Robert Payne, who started the Victoria Preserving Company.

By 1880, it was named the Red Cross preserving company. During the fruit season it employed 230 people, and was the largest employer in Prahran. William Peacock bought the premises and turned it into the 'OK' Jam Co in 1895 and resold it to Henry Jones IXL. Jam production continued in the building for this firm until 1970.

At a cost of $20 million the site was redeveloped and opened on 9 October 1979 as a shopping centre named The Jam Factory, offering modern fashions, gift stores cafes. Georges had a store. In 1995 it was redeveloped again.
Village Cinemas took the upstairs space. Georges moved out and many tenants changed.

The shopping centre also housed the first Australian Borders shop opening in 1998. It has since closed, along with the rest of the bankrupt chain, in 2011, when its regional parent company, REDgroup Retail, went into administration. The Borders space is now occupied by Topshop. The Jam Factory was also chosen by Brazin to be the first site to reintroduce Virgin Megastores in Australia opening in 2002. It was closed by Sanity in 2010 with the Virgin space now occupied by the country's first Urban by Target store.

Before these major tenants closed their Jam Factory outlets, its owner, Challenger, announced in June 2008 a $700 million redevelopment that did not proceed. It would have seen the historic factory building demolished and replaced with a new style shopping centre (54,000 square metres of shops, more than double the present size), apartment towers built on the car park closest to Virgin Megastore/Urban by Target, 8,000 square metres of office space, and a 100-room hotel. Challenger then attempted to sell the entire site in May 2009 for about $110 million without success. In 2015 the Jam Factory was purchased by Newmark Capital.

References

External links
 

Buildings and structures in the City of Stonnington
Heritage-listed buildings in Melbourne
Manufacturing plants in Melbourne
Shopping centres in Melbourne
Shopping malls established in 1979
1979 establishments in Australia